The 1940 Army Cadets football team represented the United States Military Academy in the 1940 college football season. In their third and final year under head coach William H. Wood, the Cadets compiled a 1–7–1 record and were outscored their opponents by a combined total of 197 to 54. The season was the first since 1899 in which the Army football team was outscored by its opponents. In the annual Army–Navy Game, the Cadets lost to the Midshipmen by a 14 to 0 score. The Cadets also suffered blowout defeats to Cornell (45-0) and Penn (48-0). 
 
No Army players were honored on the All-America team.  Three weeks after the end of the 1940 season, the War Department ordered coach Wood back to active troop duty and named Earl Blaik as head coach for the 1941 season.

Schedule

References

Army
Army Black Knights football seasons
Army Cadets football